Lars Henrik Skage (born 9 February 1992) is a Norwegian footballer who plays for the Norwegian Lysekloster team.

He started his career in IL Gneist and Fana IL, and joined SK Brann in March 2011. He played one cup game and one league game as a substitute. In 2012, he rejoined Fana, but left for Gneist in the Fourth Division halfway through the season.

References

1992 births
Living people
Footballers from Bergen
Norwegian footballers
SK Brann players
Eliteserien players
Fana IL players

Association football defenders